Goosebumps is a 2015 American horror comedy film directed by Rob Letterman and written by Darren Lemke. Based on R. L. Stine's children's horror book series of the same name, it stars Jack Black as a fictionalized version of Stine who teams up with his teenage daughter (Odeya Rush), and their neighbor (Dylan Minnette), to save their hometown after all of the monsters from the Goosebumps franchise escape from his works, wreaking havoc in the real world. Amy Ryan, Ryan Lee, and Jillian Bell appear in supporting roles.

Development on a Goosebumps feature film adaptation began in 1998, with Tim Burton attached to direct. After failing to find a script to determine which book to adapt, the project was halted. In early 2008, Columbia Pictures acquired the rights to create a Goosebumps-based film, and the project reentered development. Principal photography lasted from April to July 2014 in Candler Park, Atlanta.

Goosebumps was theatrically released in the United States on October 16, 2015, by Columbia Pictures. The film was a commercial success and garnered generally positive reviews from critics, with praise for its humor and many references to the Goosebumps franchise, and grossed $158 million against its $84 million budget.

A standalone sequel, Goosebumps 2: Haunted Halloween, was released on October 12, 2018, with only Black returning as Stine in an uncredited supporting role.

Plot
Following his father's death, teen Zach Cooper and his mother Gale move from New York City to the small town of Madison, Delaware. Settling in the neighborhood, Zach meets his neighbor Hannah, whose overprotective father tells him to stay away.

The next morning at the local high school where Gale is introduced as the new vice-principal, Zach befriends Champ, a cowardly but friendly student. That night, Hannah invites Zach to an abandoned amusement park where they get to know each other. Upon returning home, Hannah's father again warns him to stay away, or bad things will happen.

Later, Gale has to supervise a school dance, leaving Zach with his aunt Lorraine. Fearing Hannah is in danger, Zach tricks her father into going to the police station while he and Champ enter his house. They find a bookshelf with numerous locked manuscripts, each one cataloging entries from the Goosebumps franchise. In response to Champ's curiosity, Zach unlocks The Abominable Snowman of Pasadena and the story's titular monster emerges from it and escapes. With Hannah's help, they track the Abominable Snowman to a local ice rink where Hannah's father appears and reimprisons it in the manuscript.

Hannah's father unintentionally reveals he is R. L. Stine, the creator of the Goosebumps franchise. He originally wrote the stories to cope with severe bullying, but the monsters featured in them became real as a result of his imagination, forcing him to keep them imprisoned in their house manuscripts. Back home, they encounter Slappy the Dummy from the Night of the Living Dummy series, who has now been freed from his manuscript. Seeking revenge on Stine for his imprisonment, Slappy incinerates his manuscript, which leaves no other way to reimprison the monsters, before fleeing with the others in The Haunted Car.

Stine and the kids are attacked by the titular gnomes from Revenge of the Lawn Gnomes and are forced to escape. Slappy releases several of his fellow monsters, causing havoc around Madison. Meanwhile, Lorraine is attacked by Fifi the Vampire Poodle from Please Don't Feed the Vampire!. Zach convinces Stine to recapture the monsters by writing a single manuscript, but it can only be done with his supernatural typewriter, which is currently on display at the high school. Along the way, they are attacked by Brent Green from My Best Friend Is Invisible and the giant mantis from A Shocker on Shock Street, forcing them to hide in the supermarket. Will Blake from The Werewolf of Fever Swamp chases them to the parking lot where he is run over by Lorraine, who survived Fifi's attack.

Stine and the kids go through a cemetery, where Zach sees Hannah become ghost-like in the moonlight before being attacked by the titular characters from Attack of the Graveyard Ghouls. Arriving at the school, Stine confesses to Zach that Hannah is actually Hannah Fairchild from The Ghost Next Door, and he originally created her to cope with his loneliness, but Hannah is unaware of this. Stine begins to write a story based on the events around them, while Zach and Champ attempt to warn everyone, but nobody believes them until the mantis attacks the building.

The rest of the monsters are then released and Slappy orders them to storm the school. Despite the best efforts of the school's staff and students to keep the monsters out, they break in nonetheless. Slappy finds Stine, breaking his fingers with the typewriter's case before he can finish the story.

Stine and the kids trick the monsters into following a school bus rigged with explosives while they board another and head for the abandoned amusement park. Realizing he'd been fooled, Slappy tracks them down and releases the Blob from The Blob That Ate Everyone as the other monsters arrive. Stine confronts it and is devoured, while the trio seek refuge in the park's ferris wheel where Zach finishes the story just before the structure is damaged by the mantis, causing it to roll towards the forest. After surviving the ordeal, Zach refuses to open the story's manuscript, because Hannah will also be sucked in, but she reveals she knew the truth about herself all along and opens it, sucking the monsters into it, kissing Zach before accepting her fate.

Sometime later, Stine begins working as a substitute teacher at the school while starting a relationship with Lorraine. After class, Stine reveals to Zach that he brought Hannah back into reality by writing a new copy of her story. Zach and Hannah kiss and leave together, Stine incinerates the copy and prepares to leave, but then finds his typewriter writing by itself. It turns out that Brent Green evaded imprisonment and is using the typewriter to write a new Goosebumps story entitled The Invisible Boy's Revenge, much to Stine's horror.

Cast

 Jack Black as R. L. Stine, the creator of the Goosebumps franchise, attempting to keep his identity secret.
 Black also provides the voice of Slappy the Dummy from the Night of the Living Dummy series Avery Lee Jones and Jake McKinnon provided the puppeteer work for Slappy.
 Black also provides the voice of Brent Green, the invisible boy from My Best Friend is Invisible.
 Dylan Minnette as Zach Cooper, Stine's new neighbor.
 Odeya Rush as Hannah Stine, Stine's daughter and Zach's new neighbor and love interest, secretly Hannah Fairchild from The Ghost Next Door.
 Ryan Lee as Champ, a student who becomes Zach's new friend.
 Amy Ryan as Gale Cooper, Zach's widowed mother who becomes the vice-principal at Madison High School.
 Jillian Bell as Lorraine Conyers, Zach's aunt and Gale's sister. She later begins a relationship with Stine.
 Halston Sage as Taylor, a popular student at Madison High School whom Champ has a crush on and later becomes his love interest.
 Steven Krueger as Davidson, a popular student at Madison High School.
 Keith Arthur Bolden as Principal Garrison, the principal of Madison High School.
 Amanda Lund as Officer Brooks, a police officer trainee partnered with Officer Stevens.
 Timothy Simons as Officer Stevens, a police officer working for the Madison Police Department.
 Ken Marino as Coach Carr, the gym teacher at Madison High School who hits on Gale.
 Karan Soni as Mr. Rooney, a teacher at Madison High School.
 Caleb Emery as a dumb jock that gets attacked by the giant mantis from A Shocker on Shock Street.
 John Bernecker as the uncredited motion-capture of Will Blake, the titular werewolf from The Werewolf of Fever Swamp.

The real R. L. Stine has a cameo as Mr. Black, a drama teacher at Madison High School, credited as "Hallway Player". Kumail Nanjiani and Luka Jones appear as two movers who encounter Slappy in an alternate opening sequence featured on home media releases.

Production
Development
The popularity of the Fox Kids' Goosebumps television series generated an interest among fans for a full-feature film based upon the show. In 1998, Tim Burton was attached to direct a Goosebumps film for 20th Century Fox. Chris Meledandri, the president of Fox Family Films at the time, said, "I think you'll see us tackling a scale of story that would be prohibitive to do on the small screen". However, the film did not materialize since they could not find a script they liked or determine which book to adapt into a film.

In the mid 90's, George A. Romero wrote a script for a film adaptation of the first original Goosebumps book Welcome To Dead House. It also introduces a villain in this version, named Foster DeVries, who is responsible for the chemical leak that turns everyone in Dark Falls into zombies. It was unknowningly rejected. It was then kept at The University of Pittsburgh. [79]

In 2008, Columbia Pictures acquired rights to create a Goosebumps film. Neal Moritz and Deborah Forte, the latter of whom had previously worked on the Goosebumps television series in the 1990s, were chosen to produce the film. Screenwriting team Scott Alexander and Larry Karaszewski were hired as screenwriters, and wrote the original script for the film. The duo decided against adapting any one book in the series, feeling the individual books in the series were too short. Thinking of ways to create a universe where all the creatures in the books could live together, they elected to do a fake biographical film where R. L. Stine writes a book and the monsters within it become real. In 2010, Carl Ellsworth was chosen to write the screenplay. On January 14, 2012, it was reported that a new draft of the screenplay would be written by Darren Lemke; Lemke co-wrote the screenplays for Shrek Forever After and Bryan Singer's Jack the Giant Slayer. In November 2012, Stine expressed pessimism about the prospect of the film, saying that he would believe that a film can be based on his Goosebumps series when he sees it. The screenplay was rated PG-13. He also mentioned Where the Wild Things Are being adapted into a film almost 50 years after publication.

Casting

In September 2013, it was reported that Jack Black was in talks to "play a Stine-like author whose scary characters literally leap off the page, forcing him to hide from his own creepy creations". Black stated that he tried to make the character "more of a sort of curmudgeonly dark, brooding beast master". He also said that he attempted to approach this film the same way he does others, trying to "make it as funny as possible". Black met with R. L. Stine to get his consent for the film, but determined that his character could not be too similar to the real one; Black explained that he needed the character to be more sinister. Rob Letterman was chosen as the director, reuniting him with Black, after working together on Shark Tale and Gulliver's Travels.

It was announced in February 2014 that Dylan Minnette had been cast as Zach Cooper, and Odeya Rush as the Stine-like author's daughter, Hannah. On February 26, 2014, it was announced that the film would be released on March 23, 2016. On April 4, 2014, it was announced that Amy Ryan and Jillian Bell had joined the cast as Cooper's mother and aunt respectively. On April 10, 2014, Ken Marino joined the cast as Coach Carr. On April 28, 2014, Halston Sage joined the cast. On May 1, 2014, the film's release date was moved up to August 7, 2015. Stine stated on May 20, 2014, that he was going to make a cameo appearance in the film.

The film was promoted at the 2014 San Diego Comic-Con International where Jack Black and Rob Letterstein interacted with Slappy the Dummy. Slappy even brought some of his "friends" out consisting of the Bog Monster from How to Kill a Monster, two Graveyard Ghouls from Attack of the Graveyard Ghouls, Cronby the Troll and a Mulgani from Deep in the Jungle of Doom, the Lord High Executioner from A Night in Terror Tower, Murder the Clown from A Nightmare on Clown Street, the Mummy of Prince Khor-Ru from Return of the Mummy, Captain Long Ben One-Leg from Creep from the Deep, Professor Shock from The Creepy Creations of Professor Shock, Count Nightwing from Vampire Breath, a Creep from Calling All Creeps!, a Body Squeezer from Invasion of the Body Squeezers: Part 1 and Part 2, Carly Beth Caldwell's Haunted Mask form from The Haunted Mask, a Scarecrow from The Scarecrow Walks at Midnight, and a Pumpkin Head from Attack of the Jack-O'-Lanterns. When Jack Black tells Slappy that it is him that Slappy wants, Slappy instructs the Lord High Executioner, Murder the Clown, and Professor Shock to take Jack Black outside to his car. As the monsters leave, Slappy tells Rob some of his pitches causing Rob to leave as well.

Some monsters due for an appearance in the film were cut for budgetary reasons, but Letterman stated that the crew tried to choose the monsters most appropriate to the story. Letterman also stated that he tried to combine both humor and horror in the film, commenting that "[t]he books themselves are legitimately scary, but they're legitimately funny, and we try to capture that". In November 2014, the release date was moved back to April 15, 2016. In January 2015, the release date was pushed forward to October 16, 2015.

Filming
In mid-April 2014, a crew of six spent three days gathering visual data for the film in downtown Madison, Georgia. The crew used a theodolite to collect points in three-dimensional space to complete a detailed survey of the city. The visual data was used to create a CGI background of the downtown. Neal Moritz and Rob Letterman stated that Madison was their first choice for the film after scouting the city. Principal photography on the film began on April 23, 2014, in Candler Park in Atlanta; they were also set to shoot the film in Conyers and Madison. On May 19, filming was taking place in the streets of Madison, with 480 Goosebumps crew members working in Madison and Morgan County. Principal photography ended on July 16, 2014. A stretch of Dawsonville Highway in Georgia was intermittently closed to film a car travelling up and down multiple bridges for the film.

Music and soundtrack

The soundtrack for the film, featuring original music composed by Danny Elfman, was released on CD on October 23, 2015, by Sony Classical Records. The digital version was released by Madison Gate Records the week before.

Songs featured in the film
 "Racketeer" - The Blue Van
 "Headlights" - OPIEN
 "Get Ugly" - Jason Derulo
 "Everybody Have Fun Tonight" by Ryan Perez-Daple
 "Better Than the Rest" - Shock Diamonds
 "Heads Will Roll" (A-Trak Remix) - Yeah Yeah Yeahs
 "Bumps Gonna Goose Ya" - MF Bumps featuring Jack Black

Release

PremiereGoosebumps had its world premiere screening on June 24, 2015, at the CineEurope film distributors' trade fair in Barcelona, Spain, where the film was presented by Black on stage.

Home mediaGoosebumps was released on Blu-ray (2D and 3D) and DVD on January 5, 2016, and includes deleted scenes, a blooper reel, interviews with the cast and crew, an alternate opening, an alternate ending, and a featurette about Slappy.

Reception

Box officeGoosebumps grossed $80.1 million in North America and $70.1 million in other territories for a worldwide total of $150.2 million, against a budget of $58 million.

In the United States and Canada, pre-release trackings indicated the film would open to between $20–31 million at 3,501 theaters. However, Sony was more conservative, and projected the film to take between $12–15 million. The film opened on October 16, 2015, alongside Bridge of Spies, Crimson Peak, and Woodlawn, however box office pundits noted that it did not face serious competition except for The Martian, which was entering its third week. It made $600,000 from its early Thursday night screenings at 2,567 theaters, and $7.4 million on its opening day. In its opening weekend the film grossed $23.5 million, beating studio projections and finishing first at the box office. It marked the fourth Sony film to reign at the top of the box office during the fall. Previously the studio scored No. 1 spots over the last seven weeks with War Room, The Perfect Guy and Hotel Transylvania 2. Families represented the largest demographics with 60%, followed by under 25 with 59% and male/female ratio was split evenly at 50/50.

Outside North America, Goosebumps was released in a total of 66 countries.  Mexico has so far represented its largest opening as well as the biggest market in terms of total earnings with $7.1 million followed by Australia ($6.3 million) and the United Kingdom and Ireland ($6 million). It opened at No. 1 in the United Kingdom and Ireland ($3.9 million). In the United Kingdom, preview takings helped Goosebumps top the box office ahead of the more heavily hyped Dad's Army. In Russia, it opened at No. 2 behind In the Heart of the Sea with $1.27 million. Furthermore, it opened in France with $1 million.

Critical reception
On Rotten Tomatoes the film has an approval rating of 78% based on 161 reviews, with an average rating of 6.38/10. The site's critical consensus reads, "Goosebumps boasts more than enough of its spooky source material's kid-friendly charm to make up for some slightly scattershot humor and a hurried pace." On Metacritic, the film has a score of 60 out of 100 based on 29 critics, indicating "mixed or average reviews". Audiences polled by CinemaScore gave the film an average grade of "A" on an A+ to F scale.

Kevin P. Sullivan of Entertainment Weekly gave the film a B rating, citing at the end of his review: "Nothing about Goosebumps is revolutionary—at a certain point you may realize that it's as if Nickelodeon produced Cabin in the Woods—but it's a never-boring trip to a world, where stories and imagination are powerful tools, that just might inspire kids to do the scariest thing of all: pick up a book".

Geoff Berkshire of Variety wrote: "The ADD overload combined with an understandably kid-friendly approach to horror (no one’s ever in real danger, and the monsters are never too scary) results in a disposable product intended to appeal to everyone but likely to resonate with no one."

Accolades

Sequel

On September 2, 2015, it was reported that a sequel was in the planning stages, with Sony looking for a screenwriter. On January 17, 2017, a January 26, 2018, release date was set and Rob Letterman confirmed that he is to return as director for the sequel. On February 6, 2017, it was announced that the film's release date has been delayed to September 21, 2018, taking the place of the release date previously held by Hotel Transylvania 3: Summer Vacation. In May 2017, the title was revealed to be Goosebumps: Horror Land. It was confirmed that Jack Black will reprise his role as R.L. Stine. It was also confirmed that Odeya Rush would return as Hannah Fairchild, R.L Stine's daughter from the first film. However, it was confirmed that the sequel will not feature any of the original cast. In November 2017, Rob Lieber was tapped to pen the script. Shortly after Ari Sandel was announced as Letterman's replacement as director. Variety reported that two scripts have been written. One script has Black reprising his role, while the other has Black cut out entirely. In December 2017, the sequel's release date was pushed to October 12, 2018. Production began on February 25, 2018, Jack Black will return in the sequel, making his characters the only one from the previous film to return. New cast members include Madison Iseman, Ben O'Brien, Caleel Harris, and Jeremy Ray Taylor. Ken Jeong, Chris Parnell, and Wendi McLendon-Covey joined the following month. Filming officially began on March 7, 2018, and in April 2018 the new title was announced as Goosebumps 2: Haunted Halloween''.

References

External links

 
 
 
 
 
 

Goosebumps
2015 films
2015 3D films
2015 comedy horror films
2015 fantasy films
2010s children's comedy films
2010s children's fantasy films
2010s fantasy comedy films
2010s ghost films
2010s monster movies
American 3D films
American children's comedy films
American children's fantasy films
American comedy horror films
American fantasy comedy films
American films with live action and animation
American ghost films
American werewolf films
Children's horror films
Columbia Pictures films
Columbia Pictures animated films
Films about books
Films based on American horror novels
Films based on children's books
Films based on works by R. L. Stine
Films directed by Rob Letterman
Puppet films
Films produced by Neal H. Moritz
Films scored by Danny Elfman

Films set in Delaware
Films shot in Atlanta
Films with screenplays by Darren Lemke
Original Film films
Sony Pictures Animation films
Village Roadshow Pictures animated films
Village Roadshow Pictures films
2010s English-language films
2010s American films